Mary Jennifer Guinness (née Hollwey; 22 August 1937 – 23 January 2016), was an English-born Irish socialite and member of the Guinness family.

She married John Henry Guinness on 9 April 1959, and they had three children: Ian Richard Guinness (b. 15 March 1961), Gillian Sarah Guinness (b. 8 July 1962) and Tania Caroline Guinness (b. 10 February 1966). She was a keen sailor and a member of Howth Yacht Club.

Kidnapping
She was kidnapped for ransom in April 1986, but rescued by the Garda Síochána from a home on Waterloo Road in south Dublin eight days later.

At trial, brothers Michael and John Cunningham were convicted, along with Anthony Kelly, after being arrested at the house on Waterloo Road. Brian McNicholl was also convicted, with the judge accepting that his role was mainly to provide a location for Guinness to be held. Kelly died in 2005 from undisclosed causes; Michael Cunningham died in 2015, aged 65, after suffering a massive heart attack at his home in Ballyfermot.

Personal life
Guinness and her family lived at Ceanchor House, Ceanchor Road, Baily, Howth, County Dublin.

Her husband died aged 52 in a mountain-walking accident in Snowdonia. Jennifer Guinness died on 23 January 2016, aged 78, following a long battle with cancer.

See also
List of kidnappings
List of solved missing person cases

References

1937 births
2010s missing person cases
2016 deaths
Deaths from cancer in Ireland
Formerly missing people
Jennifer
Irish female sailors (sport)
Irish socialites
Kidnapped Irish people
Missing person cases in Ireland
Place of birth missing
Place of death missing